Barbarigo was a World War II Italian . It was built by the Cantieri Riuniti dell'Adriatico, and was commissioned on 19 September 1938.

History

After early peacetime training activity, and two fruitless missions in the Mediterranean Sea, the Barbarigo was assigned to the Atlantic theater, reaching its base in Bordeaux on 8 September 1940, after an unsuccessful patrol.

From October 1940 to May 1941, she went on three missions around Irish waters, which obtained only the damaging of a merchantman. In July, she sailed to the west of the Strait of Gibraltar and obtained its first successes, sinking the British ship Macon (5135 tls) on 25 July, and then the oiler Horn Shell (8272 tls), before turning for port. On 22 October, Barbarigo sailed again, under the command of Capitano di Corvetta Enzo Grossi, but the patrol was unsuccessful. On the next patrol, the submarine met a lighted ship, but Grossi torpedoed and sank her nonetheless (it was the neutral Spanish ship SS Navemar), on 23 January 1941.

Afterwards, Barbarigo was sent to Brazilian waters, departing Bordeaux on 30 April. She was responsible for the first Brazilian war action of World War II; she attacked the Brazilian merchant ship Comandante Lyra on 18 May 1942, without sinking her, and she was chased by Brazilian aero-naval forces for five days. The submarine managed to escape two attacks by Brazilian B-25 aircraft.

With himself and his crew convinced to having seen and felt the battleship being struck and sinking, Barbarigo sailed away, while the American ships had not even been aware of the attack. Grossi reported his sinking, and, despite the doubts and misgivings of BETASOM commander Romolo Polacchini, the action was widely publicized on Italian and German press; Grossi was awarded with a Gold Medal of Military Valour and promoted to Capitano di Fregata (Commander). On its way home, Barbarigo attacked and sank the ship Charlbury (4836 tls), 28 May.

On 29 August, the submarine sailed again, this time for a mission around the African coast. Barbarigo returned to port on the night of 29 October. Again, Grossi's success was widely reported, and he was promoted to Capitano di Vascello (Captain) and awarded a second Gold Medal; he left the submarine to replace Polacchini as BETASOM commander. After the war, Grossi's actions would be the object of two enquiries in 1949 and 1962, which concluded that he and his crew had been in good faith, but stripped him of his promotions and awards.

On 24 January 1943, the submarine departed for its last mission as an attack submarine, in which it sank the ships Monte Igueldo (3453 tls) on 24 February, Alfonso Pena (3540 tls) on 2 March, and Staghound on 3 March, before returning to Bordeaux on 3 April.

After a period of time for repairs, as well as some replacements and retraining of crew, the submarine was converted into a transport to carry materiel between Germany and Japan in 1943, with guns, torpedoes and all but one periscope being removed; it departed Bordeaux on 16 June, with 130 tons of valuable load, but disappeared. After the war, British records showed that an unidentified submarine had been attacked and presumed sunk between 17 and 19 June, in the area where Barbarigo might have been.

See also

 Italian submarines of World War II

Notes

References 
 
 Barbarigo at regiamarina.net 
 Barone, João (2013) "1942: O Brasil e sua guerra quase desconhecida" (1942: Brazil and its almost forgotten war)  Editora Nova Fronteira

External links
 Barbarigo  Marina Militare website

Marcello-class submarines
Ships built in Monfalcone
1938 ships
World War II shipwrecks in the Atlantic Ocean
Lost submarines of Italy
Maritime incidents in June 1943
Missing submarines of World War II
Ships built by Cantieri Riuniti dell'Adriatico
Merchant submarines